Cimarron-Memorial High School is a public high school in Las Vegas, Nevada and part of the Clark County School District.

Extracurricular activities

Athletics 
The athletic program that represents Cimarron-Memorial is known as the Spartans and competes in the Northwest Division of the Sunset 4A Region.

Nevada Interscholastic Activities Association State Championships 
Basketball (Boys) - 1994, 1999
Football - 1998, 1999
Wrestling - 1996, 1997, 1998, 1999, 2000, 2003, 2004, 2005, 2006, 2009, 2010, 2011
Cheerleading - 2008, 2009, 2010
Track and Field (Boys)- 2004
Flag Football - 2017

Notable alumni 

Marcus Banks -NBA Memphis Grizzlies 
Brandon Marshall - NFL player (currently with Denver Broncos, Jacksonville Jaguars)
Michael Dunn - Current MLB player (currently with Colorado Rockies, New York Yankees, Atlanta Braves)
Vernon Fox - American football player, Denver Broncos, current head football coach at Faith Lutheran in Las Vegas, NV.
Brad Thompson - baseball player, currently with the St. Louis Cardinals
Mike Esposito - MLB player (Colorado Rockies pitcher)
Beth Riesgraf - Hollywood actress
Roy Nelson - professional mixed martial artist, was competing in the UFC, currently in Bellator MMA
Zach Walters - baseball player
Amy Purdy - Paralympic snowboarder and public speaker
Natasha Wicks - Formerly part of the sorority of UFC Octagon Girls

Feeder schools
Richard H. Bryan Elementary School
Marc Kahre Elementary School
Dorothy Eisenberg Elementary School
James B. McMillian Elementary School
Edythe & Lloyd Katz Elementary School
Berkeley L. Bunker Elementary School
Doris M. Reed Elementary School
Bertha Ronzone Elementary School
R.E. Tobler Elementary School
Ernest Becker Middle School
Irwin & Susan Molasky Junior High School
J. Harold Brinley Middle School

References

External links 
Cimarron-Memorial High School homepage
Clark County School District homepage
Nevada Interscholastic Activities Association (NIAA)

Clark County School District
Educational institutions established in 1991
High schools in Clark County, Nevada
School buildings completed in 1991
Public high schools in Nevada
1991 establishments in Nevada